Lehigh Defense is a US bullet manufacturer, known primarily (in the civilian market) for its line of solid copper monolithic bullets, located in Clarksville, Texas. Wilson Combat bought the company in 2021.

References

External links
 Lehigh Defense YouTube channel

Ammunition manufacturers
Manufacturing companies based in Texas
Companies with year of establishment missing